Tin Lučin (born 16 August 1999) is a Croatian handball player who plays for Wisła Płock and the Croatian national team.

Lučin started his senior career playing for Kozala then Zamet where he showed his great playing ability in League and EHF Cup matches. After one season with Zamet he joined PPD Zagreb with whom he also stayed for one season due to lack of playing time.

Honours
Zagreb
Premier League: 2017-18
Croatian Cup: 2018

Wisła Płock
 Polish Cup: 2022
EHF European League bronze medalist: 2022

References

External links
Eurohandball profile
League stats
Hrs profile

1999 births
Living people
Croatian male handball players
Handball players from Rijeka
RK Zamet players
RK Zagreb players
Wisła Płock (handball) players